The 2001 Singapore Open (officially known as the Yonex-Sunrise Singapore Open 2001 for sponsorship reasons) was a four-star badminton tournament that took place at the Singapore Indoor Stadium in Singapore, from August 15 to August 19, 2001. The total prize money on offer was US$120,000.

Venue
Singapore Indoor Stadium

Final results

References

Singapore Open (badminton)
Singapore
2001 in Singaporean sport